Metasilicic acid is a hypothetical chemical compound with formula .  

Metasilicates occur widely in nature as inosilicates.

References

Oceanography
Aquatic ecology
Silicon compounds